The Datapoint 2200 was a mass-produced programmable terminal usable as a computer, designed by Computer Terminal Corporation (CTC) founders Phil Ray and Gus Roche and announced by CTC in June 1970 (with units shipping in 1971). It was initially presented by CTC as a versatile and cost-efficient terminal for connecting to a wide variety of mainframes by loading various terminal emulations from tape rather than being hardwired as most contemporary terminals, including their earlier Datapoint 3300. However, Dave Gust, a CTC salesman, realized that the 2200 could meet Pillsbury Foods's need for a small computer in the field, after which the 2200 was marketed as a stand-alone computer. Its industrial designer John "Jack" Frassanito has later claimed that Ray and Roche always intended the Datapoint 2200 to be a full-blown personal computer, but that they chose to keep quiet about this so as not to concern investors and others. Also significant is the fact that the terminal's multi-chip CPU (processor)'s instruction set became the basis of the Intel 8008 instruction set, which inspired the Intel 8080 instruction set and the x86 instruction set used in the processors for the original IBM PC and its descendants.

Technical description 
The Datapoint 2200 had a built-in full-travel keyboard, a built-in 12-line, 80-column green screen monitor, and two 47 character-per-inch cassette tape drives each with 130 KB capacity. Its size, and shape—a box with protruding keyboard—approximated that of an IBM Selectric typewriter. Initially, a Diablo 2.5 MB 2315-type removable cartridge hard disk drive was available, along with modems, several types of serial interface, parallel interface, printers and a punched card reader. Later, an 8-inch floppy disk drive was also made available, along with other, larger hard disk drives. An industry-compatible 7/9-track (user selectable) magnetic tape drive was available by 1975. In late 1977, Datapoint introduced ARCNET local area networking. The original Type 1 2200 shipped with 2 kilobytes of serial shift register main memory, expandable to 8K. The Type 2 2200 used denser 1 kbit RAM chips, giving it a default 4K of memory, expandable to 16K. Its starting price was around US $5,000, and a full 16K Type 2 2200 had a list price of just over $14,000. 

The 8-bit processor architecture that CTC designed for the Datapoint 2200 was implemented in four distinct ways, all with nearly identical instruction sets, but very different internal microarchitectures: CTC's original design that communicated data serially, CTC's parallel design, the Texas Instruments TMC 1795, and the Intel 8008.

Datapoint 2200 Version II (CTC's parallel design) was much faster than the TMC 1795, which was slightly faster than the original serial design of the Datapoint 2200, which in turn was considerably faster than the 8008.

The 2200 models were succeeded by the 5500, 1100, 6600, 3800/1800, 8800, etc.

The fact that most laptops and cloud computers today store numbers in little-endian format is carried forward from the original Datapoint 2200. Because the original Datapoint 2200 had a serial processor, it needed to start with the lowest bit of the lowest byte in order to handle carries. Microprocessors descended from the Datapoint 2200 (the 8008, Z80, and the x86 chips used in most laptops and cloud computers today) kept the little-endian format used by that original Datapoint 2200.

The seed of the x86 architecture
The original design called for a single-chip 8-bit microprocessor for the CPU, rather than a processor built from discrete TTL modules as was conventional at the time. In 1969, CTC contracted two companies, Intel and Texas Instruments, to make the chip. TI was unable to make a reliable part and dropped out. Intel was unable to make CTC's deadline. Intel and CTC renegotiated their contract, ending up with CTC keeping its money and Intel keeping the eventually completed processor.

CTC released the Datapoint 2200 using about 100 TTL components (SSI/MSI chips) instead of a microprocessor, while Intel's single-chip design, eventually designated the Intel 8008, was finally released in April 1972.

Even though the Datapoint 2200 processor design employed a 1-bit microarchitecture, operating serially one bit at a time, it performed faster than the Intel 8008 microprocessor which employed an 8-bit microarchitecture.

Possibly because of their speed advantages compared to MOS circuits, Datapoint continued to build processors out of TTL chips until the early 1980s.

Nonetheless the 8008 was to have a seminal importance. It was the basis of Intel's line of 8-bit CPUs, which was followed by their assembly language compatible 16-bit CPUs — the first members of the x86 family, as the instruction set was later to be known. Already successful and widely used, the x86 architecture's further rise after the success in 1981 of the original IBM Personal Computer with an Intel 8088 CPU means that most desktop, laptop and server computers in use  have a CPU instruction set directly based on the work of CTC's engineers. The instruction set of the highly successful Zilog Z80 microprocessor can also be traced back to the Datapoint 2200 as the Z80 was backwards-compatible with the Intel 8080. More immediately, the Intel 8008 was adopted by very early microcomputers including the SCELBI, Mark-8, MCM/70 and Micral N.

Credits 
The original instruction set architecture was developed by Victor Poor and Harry Pyle. The TTL design they ended up using was made by Gary Asbell. Industrial design (how the box's exterior looked, including the company's logo) was done by Jack Frassanito.

Specifications
Main unit

 Processor: 8-bit CPU instruction set architecture with a 1-bit microarchitecture made from standard TTL components. The Intel 8008 was a nearly 100% compatible 8-bit microarchitecture design and LSI microprocessor implementation.
 Memory: 2K RAM, expandable to 16K
 Display: Text only, 80×12 characters
 Storage: 2 tape drives, optional 8-inch Shugart floppy drive

Peripherals

Users of the 2200 and succeeding terminals eventually had several optional units to choose from. Among these were
 Modems
 Hard disks
 Printers
 ARCnet LAN

See also 
 Kenbak-1

References

External links 
Information about the Datapoint 2200 at OLD-COMPUTERS.COM – Including a picture of the terminal
Datapoint documentation on bitsavers.org
Page with links to a doctoral thesis about early microprocessor history, with many details about Datapoint's role
The man who invented the PC
datapoint.org: Unofficial Datapoint Organization WEB site

Character-oriented terminal
Early microcomputers
Personal computers
Computer-related introductions in 1970
8-bit computers